Mohamed Huzam (23 May 1970 – 11 August 2022) was a Maldivian playback singer.

Career
In 1993, Huzam performed the song "Mulhi Jaan Hithaa" from the album Hiyani and later incorporated into the soundtrack album of Sitee (1993), which went on to become a breakthrough song for him which resulted in him having several music offers after its success. The same year, he sang the song "Loabi Maquboolu Nuvee" for the film Jazubaathu (1993), originating from the album Hiyani which fetched him the first Gaumee Film Award for Best Male Playback Singer. His next album Havaas (1997) was also loved by the audience. After the songs "Vilaathah Ehvanee Ey" and "Liyefaa Vamey Hithugaa Thinan" from the film Aan... Aharenves Loabivin (2002), he became inactive in the music scene though he was part of few studio albums released afterwards until the year 2006. After a gap of two years, Huzam was heard in the song "Loabin Kalaage Athugaa" from the album Loabi Vaathee (2009). In 2010, Huzam was bestowed with the Best Male Singer Award for the lullaby, "Dhonkan'bulo Nidhaalaashey" from the album Dhonkan'bulo (2001).

"Mausoom" from the film Amaanaaiy (1998), "Dhinee Zaharu Mithuraa" from Malakaa (1999), "Nayaa Farive Zeenaiyvee" from the album Gumree (2000), "Thadhaa Veynugaa" from the television drama Hulhukolhu (2000) and "Beynumey Ishqaa" from Neyvaa (2000) remain as some of his most popular releases in his career. Despite "disappearing" from the industry, many of his songs remain popular even after decades of their release. In 2018, Huzam was ranked second in the list of the "Most Desired Comeback Voices", compiled by Dho?. Aishath Maaha from the same publication opined that the "emotion and pain" in his voice has favoured him with the success in many of his releases.

Huzam died on 11 August 2022 after a long illness, whilst being treated abroad in India.

Discography

Feature film

Short film

Television

Non-film songs

Accolades

References 

1970 births
2022 deaths
People from Malé
Maldivian playback singers